Sharon Percy is a British actress.

Biography 

Percy was born 28 September 1971 in Newcastle upon Tyne, England. Percy started her acting career at the age of eight. She joined the youth theatre at the New Tyne Theatre, and stayed as a member until she was eighteen. After a performing arts course at Newcastle College, Percy was spotted by Live Theatre Company's Artistic Director Max Roberts, and was cast in the play Your Home In The West alongside Geordie favourites like Robson Green and Charlie Hardwick.

Since then, Percy has worked in theatre, television and radio productions, including a production of Cooking with Elvis in London’s West End with comedian Frank Skinner, Granada’s Cracker with Robbie Coltrane and Ricky Tomlinson, and is featured in the feature film School for Seduction starring Kelly Brook and Tim Healy.

Filmography 
I, Daniel Blake (2016)
Henry (2011)
The Ball (2010)
Because I Love You (2009) .... Angie
Kaz (2006)
Wicked (2005) .... Rita
Time for Bed (2004) .... Andrea
School for Seduction (2003) ....  Karen
Billy Elliot (1999) .... Jenny Poulson
The Student Prince (1997) .... Karen

Television 
Joe Maddison's War
Grumpy Old Holiday
Steel River Blues
55 Degrees North
The Welsh in Shakespeare
Byker Grove
Cracker
Finney
Harry
Mean Streets
Sex In The Dark
The Audition
The Venchie
Funny Man
Walter Wall Commercial
Winns Insurance Commercial
Vera

Theatre 
Chalet Lines
The Magical Mess Up
You'll Never Hook A Haddock
The Last Post
Cooking with Elvis
Sleeping Beauty
Twelve Tales of Tyneside
Blow Your House Down
And A Nightingale Sang
The Swinging Sisters
Jack and the Beanstalk
Dick Whittington
Christmas Cat and The Pudding Pirates
Your Home In The West
There Was An Old Woman
Up and Running

Radio 
Can't See For Looking (The Recall Man - Series Two) - BBC Radio 4
The Bottle Factory Outing - BBC Radio 4
The Painter and the Fisher Girl - BBC Radio 4
Mr Bellings Diner (Football Stories for Girls) - BBC Radio 4
Hook - BBC Radio 4
Frozen Images - BBC Radio 3
Eraser - BBC Radio 4
Selling Horses - BBC Radio 4
Deep Down - BBC Radio 4
My Uncle Freddie - BBC Radio 4
The Tyneside Mysteries - BBC Radio 4
Blood Sugar - BBC Radio 4
Gristle - BBC Radio 3

References

External links

English stage actresses
English film actresses
English television actresses
English radio actresses
Actresses from Newcastle upon Tyne
1971 births
Living people